Coming Back As a Man is a song by Caro Emerald. It was released as a Digital download on 10 April 2014 in the Benelux as 5th single from the album The Shocking Miss Emerald. It was added to the 'A' list on BBC Radio 2.

Track listing

Release history

References

2014 songs
Caro Emerald songs
2014 singles
Songs written by David Schreurs
Songs written by Vincent DeGiorgio